This is a list of supermarket chains in Bulgaria. The concept of supermarkets (and later hypermarkets) came to Bulgaria after 1989 and most supermarkets are made up of joint ventures between Bulgarian and foreign investors. Since 2000, there has been a strong growth in the number of supermarkets in the country, particularly in Sofia and other main urban areas. For supermarkets worldwide, see List of supermarkets.

Supermarkets and hypermarkets

Former chains

Home improvement, furniture and toys

Former chains

Consumer electronics

Former chains

Clothing, cosmetics, sport and healthcare

Gallery

References

Bulgaria

Supermarkets
|}